The following are lists of the highest-grossing animated feature films first released in the 2010s.

Highest-grossing animated films of the 2010s

Figures are given in U.S. dollars (USD). DreamWorks Animation is the most represented studio with 12 films on the list, while Pixar has the highest total of any animation studio in this decade, and is the most represented studio with four films in the Top 10. Distributors listed are for the original theatrical release.

Highest-grossing film by year

See also
 List of animated feature films of the 2010s

Notes 

 CP Released along with Columbia Pictures internationally.

References

2010s
 
Animated
Animated
Highest-grossing
Highest-grossing animated